Avo-Himm Looveer (16 August 1941 – 1 May 2002) was an Estonian architect.

Looveer was born in Kodasema. He was one of the members of artistic collective "The Tallinn Ten".

Works
 Tallinn Olympic Yachting Centre (with Henno Sepmann, Peep Jänes and Ants Raid)
 building at Gonsiori and Vilmsi Street (1984–1990)

References

1941 births
2002 deaths
20th-century Estonian architects
People from Paide